Geoffrey "Geoff" Morris is an English professional rugby league footballer who played in the 1970s and 1980s. He played at club level for Castleford (List of Castleford Tigers players Heritage № 565), Rochdale Hornets, and Doncaster.

Geoff Morris played , i.e. number 5, in Castleford's 10-5 victory over Bradford Northern in the 1981 Yorkshire County Cup Final during the 1981–82 season at Headingley Rugby Stadium, Leeds, on Saturday 3 October 1981.

References

Living people
Castleford Tigers players
Doncaster R.L.F.C. coaches
Doncaster R.L.F.C. players
English rugby league coaches
English rugby league players
Place of birth missing (living people)
Rochdale Hornets players
Rugby league wingers
Year of birth missing (living people)